Anishinabek Educational Institute (AEI) is an Aboriginal-owned and controlled post-secondary institution in Canada. Aboriginal institutes partner with colleges and universities to offer students degree programs, apprenticeships, certificate programs and diploma programs. AEI was founded to provide greater access to post-secondary education for Aboriginal peoples. AEI delivers post-secondary programs approved by the Ministry of Training, Colleges and Universities. The educational curriculum was adapted to meet the needs of Aboriginal learners to ensure it reflects community needs, cultural heritage and identity.

Campus
The AEI main office is located on the Nipissing First Nation, and its satellite campuses are on Fort William First Nation and Munsee-Delaware First Nation. The Main Campus is 1 Migiizi Miikan in North Bay. The Munsee-Delaware Campus is located 533 Thomigo Road in Muncey. The Fort William Campus is located in 300 Anemki Place, Suite A in Fort William First Nation.

History

In June 1993, The Union of Ontario Indians (UOI), at the Anishinabek Grand Council on the Chippewa's of Kettle & Stony Point First Nation, the Chiefs in Assembly directed the Union of Ontario Indians Education Directorate to develop a model of an Anishinabek post-secondary institution. The model includes provisions for satellite campuses and a community-based delivery system.

In June 1994, the Chiefs at the Anishinabek Grand Council on the Rocky Bay First Nation, directed that, the Education Directorate formally establish the Anishinabek Educational Institute (AEI) in accordance with the model that was submitted and ratified. (Res. 94/13)

Partnerships

AEI offers programs and courses of study in partnership with all levels of government; commissions; industries; commerce and other education and training institutions. AEI offers programs in partnership with Canadore College, St.Clair College and more.

Programs offered

Native Early Childhood Education
First Nation Child Welfare Advocate Certificate
Native Community Worker - Traditional Healing Methods Diploma 
Pre Health Sciences Certificate
Social Service Worker (Tending the Fire/Caring for Water) Diploma

Personal Support Worker - Certificate
Practical Nursing Diploma

Scholarships & Bursaries
The Government of Canada sponsors an Aboriginal Bursaries Search Tool that lists over 680 scholarships, bursaries, and other incentives offered by governments, universities, and industry to support Aboriginal post-secondary participation.

See also

 Union of Ontario Indians

References

External links

Adult Learner Friendly Institutions Canada
Anishinabek Nation - Union of Ontario Indians
Algonquin Anishinabeg Nation Tribal Council

1993 establishments in Ontario
Educational institutions established in 1993
First Nations education
First Nations in Ontario
Indigenous universities and colleges in North America
Universities and colleges in Ontario
Anishinabek Nation